The Little Dart River is a tributary of the River Taw in Devon, England.  It joins the Taw a mile west of Chulmleigh.

The Little Dart rises near Rackenford.  It flows west past Witheridge and through a deep wooded valley between Chawleigh and Chulmleigh before meeting the Taw.

Devon County Council has promoted an 11-mile walking route, the Little Dart Ridge and Valley Walk, which links the Two Moors Way at Witheridge to the Tarka Trail at Eggesford railway station.

A survey completed in 2007 examining the water quality of the river Taw and its tributaries. The result in the Little Dart was a marginal failure, put down to the Dairy farming and fertilizers being spread in the area.

Notes 

Rivers of Devon
1LittleDart